Norbert Wagner may refer to:

 Norbert Wagner (philologist) (born 1929), German philologist
 Norbert Wagner (sailor) (born 1935), German sailor